Mensur Bajramović (born 15 August 1965) is a Bosnian professional basketball coach.  Since November 2018, he has coached South China of HK A1 Division.

In earlier years, he coached the Bosnia and Herzegovina national basketball team.

References

External links
Eurobasket.com Profile
Real GM Profile

1965 births
Living people
Bosnia and Herzegovina basketball coaches
Sportspeople from Zenica
South China AA basketball coaches
KK Kvarner players